Promachus (died 324 BC) was a common soldier in Alexander's army. In 324 BC at Susa, when a drinking contest was held in connection with the funeral of Indian philosopher Calanus. According to Plutarch, citing Chares of Mytilene, Promachus drank the equivalent of 13 litres of unmixed wine and won the first prize of a golden crown worth a talent. He died three days later and forty-one other contestants allegedly died of alcohol poisoning as well.

References

Ancient Macedonian soldiers
Alcohol-related deaths in Greece
4th-century BC Greek people
324 BC deaths
Year of birth unknown